The Queen's County by-election of 1870 was fought on 4 January 1870.  The by-election was fought due to the elevation to the peerage of the incumbent Liberal MP John Wilson FitzPatrick.  It was won by the unopposed Liberal candidate Edmund Dease.

References

1870 elections in the United Kingdom
By-elections to the Parliament of the United Kingdom in Queen's County constituencies
Unopposed by-elections to the Parliament of the United Kingdom (need citation)
1870 elections in Ireland